William Smith    was Provost of Aberdeen in the middle of the 18th century.

Notes

Scottish Episcopalian clergy
Provosts of St Andrew's Cathedral, Aberdeen